Guzel Shamilyevna Yakhina (born 1 June 1977, Kazan) is a Russian author and screenwriter. She is a winner of the Big Book literary prize and the Yasnaya Polyana Literary Award.

Biography
Guzel Shamilevna Yakhina was born in Kazan. Her mother is a doctor, while her father is an engineer. She spoke Tatar at home and learned Russian only after she started going to daycare.

She studied at the Department of Foreign Languages in the Tatar State University of Humanities and Education. In 1999, she moved to Moscow. In 2015, she graduated from the Moscow School of Film with a degree in screenwriting.

She opposed the 2022 Russian invasion of Ukraine, stating that "Belief in peace was an inalienable part of Soviet childhood, instilling that belief in the identity of each of us. That belief seemed unshakable, as if it would last until the end of time... The news on February 24, 2022, crushed me. My world wasn’t upended, it was simply destroyed," and adding that "This is not my war. I refuse to consider it mine."

Career
Yakhina worked in public relations and advertising. She began her writing career with publications in the journals Neva and Oktyabr. Sections of her debut novel Zuleikha appeared in the journal Siberian Fires.

Yakhina's debut novel is based on the experiences of her grandmother, a Tatar. In the 1930s, as part of dekulakization programme, the Soviets forcefully relocated many Tatars from the European part of the USSR to Siberia. Yakhina's grandmother was among them. She was exiled at a young age and was able to return home only sixteen years later. The novel describes the experiences of Zuleikha, a peasant Tatar woman. Her husband resisted dekulakization and was killed. Zuleikha was transported to Siberia and left in a remote location on Angara River with little means of survival. Zuleikha had to overcome the harsh conditions, build relationships with other exiles and forge her new identity and reasons for living. Yakhina initially wrote the draft as a screenplay, and later rewrote it as a novel. Before being accepted for publication, the novel was rejected by multiple publishers.

Works

Short stories

Screenplays
 Подарок (Gift), 2016

Novels
 , 
translated into English by Lisa C. Hayden as

Awards
 Yasnaya Polyana, 2015
 Big Book for Zuleikha, 2015
 Ticket to the Stars, literary prize of the City of Kazan, 2015
 Les prix du magazine "Transfuge" de la rentrée littéraire, France 2017

References 

21st-century Russian novelists
Russian women novelists
1977 births
Writers from Kazan
Living people
Women screenwriters
21st-century Russian women writers
Tatar writers
21st-century Russian screenwriters